Eumolpini is a tribe of leaf beetles in the subfamily Eumolpinae. It is the largest tribe in the subfamily, with approximately 170 genera found worldwide. Members of the tribe almost always have a longitudinal median groove on the pygidium, which possibly helps to keep the elytra locked at rest. They also generally have a subglabrous body, as well as appendiculate pretarsal claws.

Taxonomy
Following the leaf beetle classification of Seeno and Wilcox (1982), the genera of Eumolpini are divided into five informal groups or "sections": Corynodites, Edusites, Endocephalites, Eumolpites and Iphimeites.

In the Catalog of the leaf beetles of America North of Mexico, published in 2003, the section Myochroites of Bromiini was placed in synonymy with the section Iphimeites in Eumolpini. The North American genera Glyptoscelis and Myochrous from Myochroites were also transferred to Iphimeites.

Genera
These 172 genera belong to the tribe Eumolpini:

 Abiromorphus Pic, 1924
 Abirus Chapuis, 1874
 †Acolaspoides Moseyko, Kirejtshuk & Nel, 2010
 Acronymolpus Samuelson, 2015
 Adorea Lefèvre, 1877
 Aemnestus Jacoby, 1908
 Agbalus Chapuis, 1874
 Agetinus Lefèvre, 1885
 Agrianes Chapuis, 1874
 Agrosterna Harold, 1875
 Ajubus Aslam, 1968
 Alethaxius Lefèvre, 1885
 Alittus Chapuis, 1874
 Allocolaspis Bechyné, 1950
 Anachalcoplacis B. Bechyné, 1983
 Anchieta Bechyné, 1954
 Antitypona Weise, 1921
 Apterodina Bechyné, 1954
 Argoa Lefèvre, 1885
 Aristonoda Bechyné, 1953
 Arnobiopsis Jacoby, 1896
 Arsoa Fairmaire, 1901
 Atrichatus Sharp, 1886
 Aulacia Baly, 1867
 Auranius Jacoby, 1881
 Australotymnes Flowers, 2009
 Balya Jacoby, 1882
 Beltia Jacoby, 1881
 Brachypnoea Gistel, 1848
 Callicolaspis Bechyné, 1950
 Caudatomolpus Bechyné, 1953
 Cazeresia Jolivet, Verma & Mille, 2005
 Chalcophana Chevrolat in Dejean, 1836
 Chalcophyma Baly, 1865
 Chalcoplacis Chevrolat in Dejean, 1836
 Chrysochares Morawitz, 1861
 Chrysochus Chevrolat in Dejean,  1836
 Chrysodinopsis Bechyné, 1950
 Chrysolampra Baly, 1859
 Cleptor Lefèvre, 1885
 Clisithera Baly, 1864
 Colaspedusa Medvedev, 1998
 Colaspinella Weise, 1893
 Colaspis Fabricius, 1801
 Colaspoides Laporte, 1833
 Corumbaea Bechyné, 1954
 Corysthea Baly, 1865
 Costalimaita Bechyné, 1954
 Coytiera Lefèvre, 1875
 Cudnellia Blackburn, 1890
 Dematochroma Baly, 1864
 Dematotrichus Gómez-Zurita, 2022
 Dermorhytis Baly, 1861
 Deuteronoda Bechyné, 1951
 Dorysternoides Bechyné & Bechyné, 1967
 Drakhshandus Aslam, 1968
 Dryadomolpus Bechyné & Bechyné, 1969
 Dumbea Jolivet, Verma & Mille, 2007
 Durangoita Bechyné, 1958
 Edusella Chapuis, 1874
 Edusoides Blackburn, 1889
 Endocephalus Chevrolat in Dejean, 1836
 Endoschyrus Jacoby, 1901
 Entomochirus Lefèvre, 1884
 †Eocenocolaspis Bukejs, Moseyko & Alekseev, 2022
 Epiphyma Baly, 1860
 Erotenia Lefèvre, 1884
 Eucampylochira Bechyné, 1951
 Eucolaspinus Lea, 1916
 Eucolaspis Sharp, 1886
 Eumolpus Weber, 1801
 Eupetale Flowers, 2021
 Euphrytus Jacoby, 1881
 Eurysarcus Lefèvre, 1885
 Exochognathus Blake, 1946
 Fractipes Bechyné, 1950
 Frenais Jacoby, 1903
 Freudeita Bechyné, 1950
 Freycolaspis Scherer, 1964
 Geloptera Baly, 1861
 Glyptoscelis Chevrolat in Dejean, 1836 (formerly in Adoxini)
 Glyptosceloides Askevold & Flowers, 1994
 Guyanica Chevrolat in Dejean, 1836
 Heminodes Jacoby, 1895
 Hermesia Lefèvre, 1877
 Hermesilla Bechyné, 1954
 Hylax Lefèvre, 1884
 Hypoderes Lefèvre, 1877
 Iphimeis Baly, 1864
 Iphimoides Jacoby, 1883
 Iphimolpus Bechyné, 1949
 Ischyrolampra Lefèvre, 1885
 Ischyrolamprina Bechyné, 1950
 Isolepronota Bechyné, 1949
 Itatiaya Bechyné, 1953
 Kumatoeides Gómez-Zurita, 2018
 Lamprosphaerus Baly, 1859
 Ledesmodina Bechyné, 1951
 Lepinaria Medvedev, 1998
 Leprocolaspis Bechyné, 1951
 Lepronida Baly, 1864
 Lepronota Chapuis, 1874
 Llanomolpus Bechyné, 1997
 Longeumolpus Springlova, 1960
 Lyraletes Bechyné, 1952
 Marajoarinha B. Bechyné, 1983
 Massiea Lefèvre, 1893
 Megalocolaspoides Medvedev, 2005
 Melinodea Jacoby, 1900
 Metaparia Crotch, 1873
 Metaxyonycha Chevrolat in Dejean, 1836
 Microaletes Bechyné, 1954
 Monrosiella Bechyné, 1945
 Montrouzierella Jolivet, Verma & Mille, 2007
 Murimolpus Bechyné, 1950
 Myochrous Erichson, 1847 (formerly in Adoxini)
 Neoiphimeis Bechyné, 1954
 Neovianaeta Bechyné, 1954
 Nodocolaspis Bechyné, 1949
 Noriaia Bechyné, 1954
 Nycterodina Bechyné, 1951
 Ocnida Lefèvre, 1885
 Olorus Chapuis, 1874
 Otilea Lefèvre, 1877
 †Paleomolpus Nadein, 2015
 Peniticus Sharp, 1876
 Percolaspis Bechyné, 1957
 Phanaeta Lefèvre, 1878
 Pilacolaspis Sharp, 1886
 Plastonothus Lefèvre, 1884
 Platycorynus Chevrolat in Dejean, 1836
 Plaumannita Bechyné, 1954
 Podoxenus Lefèvre, 1877
 Prionodera Chevrolat in Dejean, 1836
 Prionoderita Flowers, 2004
 Promecosoma Lefèvre, 1877
 Pseudabirus Fairmaire, 1897
 Pseudedusia Jacoby, 1898
 Pseudochoris Jacoby, 1890
 Pseudocolaspoides Medvedev, 2005
 Pygocolaspis Bechyné, 1950
 Rhabdopterus Lefèvre, 1877
 Rhinobolus Blackburn, 1890
 Ruffoita Bechyné, 1950
 Samuelsonia Jolivet, Verma & Mille, 2007
 Schizonoda Bechyné, 1950
 Sibotes Lefèvre, 1885
 Sphaeropis Lefèvre, 1876
 Spintherophyta Dejean, 1836
 Stereonoda Bechyné, 1951
 Sterneurus Lefèvre, 1875
 Sternocolaspis Bechyné, 1950
 Stylomolpus Bechyné, 1953
 Susteraia Bechyné, 1950
 Taimbezinhia Bechyné, 1954
 Talurus Lefèvre, 1889
 Taophila Heller, 1916
 Tectaletes Bechyné, 1953
 Thasycles Chapuis, 1874
 Theocolaspis Bechyné, 1953
 Therses Jacoby, 1890
 Thyra Lefèvre, 1875
 Thysanomeros Flowers, 2003
 Trichocolaspis Medvedev, 2005
 Tricholapita Gómez-Zurita & Cardoso, 2020
 Tymnes Chapuis, 1874
 Tyrannomolpus Nadein & Leschen, 2017
 Vianaeta Bechyné, 1949
 Vieteumolpus Medvedev, 2004
 Wittmerita Bechyné, 1950
 Xanthopachys Baly, 1864
 Zenocolaspis Bechyné, 1997 

The genus Megascelis Latreille, 1825, which is traditionally placed in the tribe Megascelidini, is also included in the Eumolpini according to ITIS.

Gallery

References

Further reading

External links

 

Beetle tribes
Eumolpinae
Articles created by Qbugbot